No Dessert Dad, till You Mow the Lawn is a 1994 American comedy film directed by Howard McCain and starring Joanna Kerns and Robert Hays.

Synopsis
Two parents (Kerns and Hays) buy self-hypnosis tapes in order to quit smoking.  The kids find the tapes and add subliminal suggestions that turn them into cool parents.

Cast
Robert Hays - Ken Cochran
Joanna Kerns - Carol Cochran
Joshua Schaefer - Justin Cochran
Larry Linville - J.J.
Allison Mack - Monica Cochran
Jimmy Marsden - Tyler Cochran
Richard Moll - Boot Camp Sergeant
Lyman Ward - Larry Driscoll
Corbin Allred - Moonpie
Michael James McDonald - Evil Hypnotist
Heather Campbell - Enemy Player
Ted Davis - Vaneet

References

External links
 

1994 films
1994 comedy films
American comedy films
Films about hypnosis
1990s English-language films
1990s American films